C. Bertram Hartman (1882–1960) was an American oil and watercolor painter. His paintings are exhibited in museums in the United States.

Early life
C. Bertram Hartman was born in Junction City, Kansas in 1882. He studied at the Art Institute of Chicago and the Academy of Fine Arts, Munich. He also studied art in Paris.

Career
Hartman painted the Canyon de Chelly in Arizona in 1916–1917. He did oil and watercolor paintings. He also did "batik textiles, book illustrations, stained glass, mosaics, and designs for rugs".

His artwork is exhibited at the Hubbell Trading Post, the Butler Institute of American Art, the Spencer Museum of Art on the campus of the University of Kansas, and the Brooklyn Museum in New York City.

Hartman was a member of the Chicago Society of Artists, the American Watercolor Society and the Mural Painters of America.

Personal life and death
Hartman and his wife Augusta (1885-1960), known as Gusta, resided in New York City and had a number of artist friends. They were very close with the Lachaises, to whom they introduced Dorothy Norman.  Gaston Lachaise sculpted a portrait of Gusta known as "The Girl with Bobbed Hair" 1923.  Casts can be seen at the Baltimore Museum of Art, the Toledo Museum of Art, and the Williams College Museum of Art. Bertram wrote numerous letters to Isabel Lachaise, which are held by the Beinecke Library at Yale University. Bertram died in New York in 1960.

References

1882 births
1960 deaths
People from Junction City, Kansas
School of the Art Institute of Chicago alumni
Academy of Fine Arts, Munich alumni
American male painters
American landscape painters
Painters from Kansas